William McWillie (November 17, 1795 – March 3, 1869) was the twenty-second governor of Mississippi from 1857 to 1859.  He was a Democrat.  McWillie was the last Governor of Mississippi prior to the outbreak of the American Civil War.

Biography
He was born near Liberty Hill, Kershaw County, South Carolina, on November 17, 1795. His father Colonel Adam McWillie was in command of the 2nd Regiment SC militia during the War of 1812, and William served as an adjutant in his father's regiment in the war.

McWillie graduated from South Carolina College (now the University of South Carolina) in 1817. He then began the study of law and was admitted to the bar in 1818.

He was married to Nancy Cunningham (1799-1827) and Catherine Anderson (1812–1873), daughter of Dr. Edward H. Anderson of Camden, South Carolina, and granddaughter of a noted officer of the Maryland Line.

Between 1836 and 1840, he served in both the South Carolina House of Representatives and the South Carolina Senate. In 1845 he moved to Mississippi.  He was elected to the United States House of Representatives in 1849, serving from December 3, 1849 to March 3, 1851. In 1858 he became Governor of Mississippi, serving until 1860.  McWillie died in Kirkwood, Madison County, Mississippi, on March 3, 1869.  He is buried in Kirkwood Cemetery, near Camden, Mississippi, the town he founded and named for his hometown of Camden, South Carolina.

His son Adam McWillie (1821 to 1861) was killed in the Civil War during the First Battle of Bull Run.

References

1795 births
1869 deaths
University of South Carolina alumni
People from Kershaw County, South Carolina
People from Madison County, Mississippi
South Carolina lawyers
Mississippi lawyers
Democratic Party members of the South Carolina House of Representatives
Democratic Party South Carolina state senators
Democratic Party governors of Mississippi
Democratic Party members of the United States House of Representatives from Mississippi
19th-century American politicians
19th-century American lawyers